JHH may refer to:

 John Hunter Hospital, a principal referral centre and a tertiary hospital for Newcastle and northern New South Wales, Australia
 Johns Hopkins Hospital, a teaching hospital and biomedical research facility of the Johns Hopkins School of Medicine in Baltimore, Maryland, United States